Bernard Joseph Wallace (21 June 1919 − 8 November 1990) was an Australian Roman Catholic bishop.

Ordained to the priesthood on 26 July 1942, Wallace was commonly known as 'Bernie' and spent some 30 years as a teacher at Banyo Seminary in Brisbane, Queensland. During his time as a seminary teacher, Wallace was often critical of the church hierarchy. Wallace was named bishop of the Roman Catholic Diocese of Rockhampton, Australia in 1974 and resigned in 1990, shortly before his death. As both a seminary teacher and bishop, Wallace was active in the local and international ecumenical movement, and was in 2010 named by the Australian Catholic Bishops Conference as one of the pioneers of ecumenism in Australia.

References 

1919 births
1990 deaths
People from Melbourne
Roman Catholic bishops of Rockhampton
20th-century Roman Catholic bishops in Australia